Malam Ini Kita Punya is the third studio album from Malaysian punk rock band, Bunkface. This album was released on 3 October 2014 at the Bee, Publika, Kuala Lumpur. The album contains seven Malay tracks, all of which were written by Sam. It is their first album produced by Sony Music Entertainment Malaysia following Bunkface signing to be under the recording company earlier in the year.

Release and promotion
For the promotion of the album, Bunkface was chosen as DiGi x Deezer Spotlight Artis of the Month. Bunkface is the first act to be featured in DiGi x Deezer Spotlight session in Malaysia. The session was held at the Bee, Publika Shopping Gallery. For Deezer promotion, the album was released on 29 September 2014; almost a week before the official launch.

Singles
Rentak Laguku was released on iTunes on 10 February 2014. The single features Malaysian rock legend, Amy Search. A music video was subsequently uploaded on Bunkface's Vevo account on 15 February 2014. The song received critical success, including winning Best Rock Song at Anugerah Industri Muzik 2013/2014 as well as short-listed for the prestigious Anugerah Juara Lagu 2014.
 Malam Ini Kita Punya was released as the second single on iTunes on 30 August 2014. A music video was subsequently uploaded on Bunkface's Vevo account on 10 November 2014. The video was shot on a helipad at KH Tower (Menara KH) in Kuala Lumpur. The video was directed by Zul Luey.
 The third radio single, Darah Muda was released on the first day of 2015 Eid al-Fitr. An official video was released on 17 July 2015 through their Vevo account. The video - directed by Nasir Mehmood Sabir Mohd (KixASS) - includes footage of Bunkface's travelogue to Ishikawa, Japan, Sam's marriage as well as their live shows.

Track listing

Awards

References 

Bunkface albums
2014 albums
Sony Music albums
Malay-language albums